The Battle of Merta was fought on 10 September 1790 between the Maratha Empire and the Rajputs of Jodhpur which resulted in a decisive Maratha victory.
The general of the Jodhpur army, Bhimraj Bakshi fled the battlefield with his horsemen before the battle started but the local Rathore chieftains refused to retreat without a fight.

Background
After the Battle of Patan, Scindia had demanded Jodhpur to pay tribute and surrender the district of Ajmer, the raja of Jodhpur was ready to pay tribute but the surrender of Ajmer was something that he was reluctant to do as Ajmer was a strategic city located in the centre of Rajasthan. War became inevitable as Scindia was not ready to negotiate and sent his army under his trusted general Benoit De Boigne to invade Marwar and bring Vijay Singh to terms. The Jodhpur raja asked all of his Rathor warriors aged between 16–70 years to join him in the protection of Marwar. Unlike the other Rajput states, the Rathors of Marwar still fought with lances and swords and despised guns. The Jodhpur infantry was also ill equipped and had no discipline, the soldiers were mostly irregulars, few of them had matchlocks and the rest were armed with swords and spears. The Scindia army had reformed its infantry under the command of the savoyan adventurer Benoit de Boigne by raising the Campoos brigades. Benoit's Campoo infantry was made up of Rajputs and Muslims from north India, he had also equipped his soldiers with french muskets and artillery, making them a dominant force. The Scindia Cavalry was commanded by Gopal Bhau and he was assisted by the Holkar cavalry under the command of Bapu Rao, Kashi Rao and Ali Bahadur.

The Maratha army under Boigne force marched towards Merta but their artillery got trapped in the river Luni. Some of the Jodhpur generals wanted to attack the Marathas at this point but Bakshi denied this proposal, this allowed the Marathas to dig their artillery out of the river. Unlike Bakshi, Boigne wanted to attack as soon as possible because of the limited supplies and the heat of the desert. There was a threat of reinforcements from the other Rajput states as well and Boigne wanted to make sure that he isolates the Jodhpur army. De Boigne silently led his men 2 hours before daybreak and made his attack on the Jodhpur infantry.

Battle

General Boigne took the Jodhpur army by surprise "some were brushing their teeth with chewed twigs, some bathing in tanks, and some still in bed" he attacked the right wing of the Jodhpur line and forced the Jodhpuri infantry to retreat after some gun fire on both sides. Boigne captured all of the Jodhpuri artillery through this skirmish and routed the enemy infantry. The Jodhpur general Bhimraj Bakshi upon seeing his men flee lost all hope and fled with his horsemen. The local Rathore chieftains however held their position and started rallying their clansmen. The Rathors charged at Boignes right wing which was commanded by Captain Rohan, who had become confident upon seeing the fleeing enemy. The Rathors killed nearly half of Rohan's men and went through the gap to attack Boignes main army. However Boigne formed a hollow square and repulsed all efforts of the Rathors. The Rathors upon finding it impossible to break through the square turned back and went around the square to attack Sindhia's cavalry that stood behind the Campoo infantry. The deccan cavalry which was stationary at that time was unable to face the charge of the Rathors and fled at first shock. Holkars cavalry however resisted the charge and a bloody hand to hand fight started between the two forces and lasted for almost 2 hours, by this time both the Sindhias and Boigne had rallied back and joined the Holkars, they slowly surrounded the Rathors and pushed them back. The Rathors were now spent, Boigne took this chance to direct his guns at the Rathors and shot them down in great numbers. The main bulk of the Rathor army had now retreated to the Merta fort but the Zard Kaprawalas, the Rathors who swear to fight to their last breath, now started preparing for a suicide charge to protect their clans honour. Boigne directed his guns and shot them at close range, killing most of the Rathors. The few who survived the cannon and musket fire charged Boignes' infantry and were killed after a short but brave fight. According to Jadunath Sarkar, "not a house of note among the Rathor clan but mourned the death of its head".

A French mercenary  Benoît de Boigne gives an eyewitness's account of a charge that took place:
"it is impossible for me to describe the feats of bravery performed by the Zard-Kaprawalas or forlorn hope of the enemy. I have seen, after their line was broken, fifteen or twenty men only return to charge one thousand infantry, and advance within ten or fifteen paces of our line, before they were all shot." "It is but just to the enemy to acknowledge that, considering the situation in which they were found, and the disorder consequent thereto, they behaved very valiantly, as they actually cut down some of our people at their guns, and two of them with a desperate fury and intrepidity, made at De Boigne himself and might possibly have killed him if they had not been hewn in pieces by his bodyguards."

Aftermath
Boigne besieged the Merta fort, the Rathors inside sued for peace when Boigne threatened to bombard it. Boigne allowed the Rathors to empty the fort and leave with their arms. Merta was then plundered for 3 days, the loot was ample although less than Patan, Opium worth rs. 50,000 was also found. After the battle, Vijay singh accepted the terms of Mahadji Scindia, he gave the Scindias the rich province of Ajmer and millions of rupees. The Rathors had been effectively weakened as most of their elite warriors and nobles had perished in battle. De Boigne was given a gun salute of hundreds of cannon shots and his pay and jagir (Land grant) were both increased.

References

Sources
 
 

Merta
Merta
1790 in India
Merta
History of Rajasthan